Hillside is a community in the Canadian province of Nova Scotia, located within the Pictou County Municipality. Located between the Town of Trenton and community of Pictou Landing, the community holds the status of designated place in Canadian census data, and had a population of 122 in the Canada 2021 Census.

Demographics 

References

Designated places in Nova Scotia
Communities in the Cape Breton Regional Municipality